The 10th Submarine Squadron was an administrative unit of the Royal Navy.

History
The squadron was formed at HMNB Clyde, Faslane, Scotland, in the 1960s to direct the Resolution-class submarines equipped with Polaris missiles that formed part of the United Kingdom's strategic nuclear deterrent. The four Resolution-class submarines would carry out a total of 229 operational patrols during their time in service with the squadron. 

The squadron would later direct the Vanguard-class submarines equipped with Trident missiles. 

In October 1993 the 3rd and 10th Squadrons at Faslane amalgamated into a new 1st Submarine Squadron (Watson).

In February 2002 all existing squadrons were disbanded and replaced by three flotillas at the base ports of Devonport, Faslane and Portsmouth.

Submarines

See also
 List of squadrons and flotillas of the Royal Navy
10th Submarine Flotilla

References

Captain Mike Gregory RN, "Commanding an SSBN Squadron," The RUSI Journal, Volume 137, 1992 - Issue 5

Submarine squadrons of the Royal Navy
Resolution-class submarines
1960s establishments in Scotland
Vanguard-class submarines
Military units and formations disestablished in 1993